Gao Xiqing (born September 1953) is the former Vice Chairman, President and Chief Investment Officer of the China Investment Corporation, one of China's sovereign wealth fund.

Early life and career
Gao obtained a bachelor of arts (1978) and a Master in Law (1981) from the University of International Business in Beijing and obtained a law degree in 1986 from Duke University's Law School and became the first Chinese citizen to pass the New York State Bar Exam. For the next two years following graduation from Duke, Gao worked as an associate at the Wall Street law firm Mudge Rose Guthrie Alexander & Ferdon (Richard Nixon's former law firm).

He then returned to China in 1988. From 1992-1995 he served as the General Counsel and the Director of Public Offerings of China Securities Regulatory Commission (CSRC). Then, from 1997–1999, he served as Deputy Chief Executive at the HK-Macao Regional Office of the Bank of China.  He later served as the Vice Chairman of the China Security Regulatory Commission (CSRC) and the Vice-Chairman for the National Council for Social Security Fund (SSF).

Gao currently serves on the Duke University Board of Trustees.

In popular culture
Gao was portrayed by Les J.N. Mau in the 2011 docudrama Too Big to Fail.

References

https://web.archive.org/web/20071023060654/http://www.law.duke.edu/magazine/2005fall/profiles/prcgaoxiqing.html
https://web.archive.org/web/20071107042117/http://www.ssf.gov.cn/enweb/NewsInfo.asp?NewsId=489
https://web.archive.org/web/20070819065904/http://www.lawon.cn/fxjcd/detail.jsp?detail_id=542 (Chinese)
http://www.theatlantic.com/doc/200801/fallows-chinese-dollars/4

External links

Gao Xiqing Ranked #4 on Sovereign Wealth Fund Institute - Public Investor 100

Duke University School of Law alumni
Chinese bankers
1953 births
Living people
Beijing University of International Business and Economics alumni
Chief investment officers